Gudrun Tandberg Høykoll (18 January 1924 – 17 May 2005) was a Norwegian politician for the Liberal Party.

She served as a deputy representative to the Norwegian Parliament from Aust-Agder during the terms 1965–1969.

References

1924 births
2005 deaths
Liberal Party (Norway) politicians
Deputy members of the Storting
Women members of the Storting